Lars Inge Olsson (born 16 November 1944) is a Swedish former alpine skier. He competed in the slalom and downhill evenets at the 1964 Winter Olympics and in the giant slalom at the 1968 Winter Olympics.

References

External links
 

1944 births
Swedish male alpine skiers
Alpine skiers at the 1964 Winter Olympics
Alpine skiers at the 1968 Winter Olympics
Olympic alpine skiers of Sweden
People from Borlänge Municipality
Living people
Sportspeople from Dalarna County
20th-century Swedish people